Greatest Hits, Vol. 3 is a greatest hits compilation by country singer Johnny Cash, released on Columbia Records in 1978 (see 1978 in music). It is the third and last part of the Johnny Cash Greatest Hits compilation series; the previous parts, Greatest Hits, Vol. 1 and Greatest Hits, Vol. 2, had been released in 1967 and 1971, respectively.

The release is notable in that it contains two songs - "It's All Over" and "Old Time Feeling," - which hadn't appeared on any Johnny Cash album before.

"It's All Over" was first released as a single in September 1976, peaking at #41 Country (a.k.a. C&W).  This song was previously demoed at House of Cash in Hendersonville on July 11, 1973, appearing 33 years later on Cash's Personal File double CD.  The 1973 demo of "It's All Over" is the only available (cd/mp3) version of this rare song as of June 2010. This was until the Reader's Digest box set The Great Seventies Recordings was released featuring this version of "It's All Over"

"Old Time Feeling" was then rush-released as Cash's next single in October 1976, reaching the Top 30 at #26 C&W.

"I Wish I Was Crazy Again", featuring Waylon Jennings, had only recently been featured on the album I Would Like to See You Again in April 1978. It was first released as the B-side of the popular #2 C&W hit "There Ain't No Good Chain Gang" (also with Jennings and also from the aforementioned album). By November 1979, popular demand caused "I Wish I Was Crazy Again" to be issued as an A-side, almost making the Top 20 at #22 C&W.

The album itself reached No. 49, despite the fact that a third of its contents had only just been featured a few months earlier on the album I Would Like to See You Again and two other tracks from the less-than-a-year-old The Rambler.

Track listing

Charts 

Album - Billboard (United States)

Singles - Billboard (United States)

References

External links 
 Luma Electronic's Johnny Cash discography listing

1978 greatest hits albums
Johnny Cash compilation albums
Columbia Records compilation albums
Albums produced by Larry Butler (producer)
Albums produced by Don Davis (record producer)